The Jonesboro White Sox were a professional baseball team in Minor League Baseball that represented Jonesboro, Arkansas, in the Northeast Arkansas League at different times from 1909 through 1941. The club was known by several other nicknames prior to 1939, when they became a farm team of the Chicago White Sox of Major League Baseball (MLB).

References
Baseball Reference

Baseball teams established in 1909
Baseball teams disestablished in 1941
Defunct Northeast Arkansas League teams
Defunct Tri-State League teams
Defunct Arkansas State League teams
Professional baseball teams in Arkansas
Chicago White Sox minor league affiliates
1941 disestablishments in Arkansas
Jonesboro, Arkansas
1909 establishments in Arkansas
Defunct baseball teams in Arkansas
Northeast Arkansas League teams